Shorea leptoderma is a species of plant in the family Dipterocarpaceae. It is a tree endemic to Borneo where it is confined to Sabah.

References

leptoderma
Endemic flora of Borneo
Trees of Borneo
Flora of Sabah
Taxonomy articles created by Polbot